C. solida may refer to:

 Archips solidus, a species of moth, synonymized as Cacoecia solida Meyrick, 1908
 Cellana solida, a species of sea snail
 Clathrodrillia solida, the solid drillia, a species of sea snail
 Clavaria fragilis, fairy fingers, a fungus synonymized as Clavaria solida Gray, 1821
 Coelolepis solida, an extinct species of jawless fish
 Corydalis solida, the fumewort, a flowering plant of northern Eurasia
 Crepidula adunca, a species of sea snail, synonymized as Crepidula solida Hinds, 1845
 Eucithara solida, a species of sea snail, synonymized as Cytharopsis solida (Reeve, 1846)